VCO may refer to:

Military
 Veterinary Corps Officer, see Veterinary corps (disambiguation)
 Viceroy's commissioned officer, British Indian Army role (1885–1947)

Technology
 Voltage-controlled oscillator, an electronic device
 Voice Carry Over, a telecommunications relay service
 Akatsuki (spacecraft), or the Venus Climate Orbiter
 Virtual Central Office, in Open Platform for NFV network-function virtualization software

Other uses
 Voyage Century Online, a nautically themed, free-to-play, massively multiplayer online role-playing game
 Vice Commodore, an elected yacht club committee member
 VCO SA, the joint-stock company, and a distributor of Volcano clothing brand